is a Japanese Tarento, artist, actress, essayist and talent agent best known as a lead vocalist and dancer of the performing arts group AAA. She is also the Middle manager of Avex Group, advertising manager of SHUFU TO SEIKATSU SHA (主婦と生活社) and public fasting Consultant of Japan Enzyme Hydrogen Medical Beauty Society (日本酵素・水素医療美容学会). Her feature film debut as an actress was in the 2006 Hollywood horror film, The Grudge 2, as Miyuki.

Career
Uno was born into a wealthy family. Her father was a copywriter and her mother was a social worker. Inspired by London's West End's Cats, Uno, from a young age, had aspirations of becoming a stage artist.

Her childhood was difficult and unsure; she described her primary school years as "dark times", as she was not good at running and jumping. Afflicted with a frail body and slow reflexes, she determined while still young  to make herself regain confidence.

She spent fifteen years at Shirayuri Gakuen (白百合学園). At the age of 8, she began to write essays and study dance at this school. At the age of 11, she and two other students left Japan, representing the Ministry of Education, to go Germany's International Summer Camp.

She could not speak with other students because she didn't know any German. She decided to study English hard and resolved on going abroad. She later studied in  London during her grade 8 summer vacation.

During her first year of high school Uno auditioned in Avex Group's "Avex Audition 2002,” where she came in second out of tens of thousands of participants. She was then signed onto the Avex Artist Academy. A year later, she set up the dance club of Shirayuri Gakuen. This club is the predecessor of AAA.

She made her debut in the 2005 drama SLOW DANCE, though it was only as background music. Later that year, she appeared as Mai Honda in the art film Their Waters (彼らの海) VIII -Sentimental Journey-. She had her first starring role as Akane Sueyoshi (末吉茜) in the 2006 antiwar drama Bokura no te (ボクラノテ).

In the same year, Columbia Pictures held an audition in search of an actor to be signed under their company. She passed the audition and made her Hollywood debut in the 2006 horror film The Grudge 2, as the Japanese student Miyuki Nazawa.

She had her first starring film role as Taniyama Miguru (谷山めぐる) in the 2010 Japan comedy film rendez-vous (ランデブー!). At the end of the year, she first appeared on NHK’s Kōhaku Uta Gassen.

In 2011, her early experiences were included in the Stepping stone Vol.7 Misako Uno, an English textbook compiled by the MEXT middle school and high school.

Discography

Albums

Singles

As lead artist

As featured artist

Promotional singles

Other charted songs

Other appearances

Filmography

Movies
2006: The Grudge 2 ... Miyuki
2010:  ... Meguru Taniyama

Stage plays
2006:  … Akane Sueyoshi
2007: Super Battle Live Delicious Gakuin Bangaihen ~Delicious 5 Shijō Saidai no Teki~
2008: Love Letters
2010:  …  
2011: Legend of the Galactic Heroes

TV drama
2008:  … supporting role Keiko Endo
2010: Massugu na Otoko
2012:  … Akane Yabuki
2013:  … Hoshino Tsukiyama
2014:

Radio
 2006–2007: Uno Misako no English Lyrics Selection 
 AAA Uno Misako no Radio Unoccoli (FM Niigata, 2011–2014)

Books
2011: 
2011:

Photo Album
2010: UNO
2012: UNO-BON
2014: You Know-UNONU- 
2016: Bloomin' 
2018: ABOUT TIME

References

External links 

 Misako Uno Official Website
 

1986 births
Singers from Tokyo
Japanese women rock singers
Japanese women singer-songwriters
Japanese singer-songwriters
Japanese women pop singers
Japanese dance musicians
Living people
AAA (band) members
21st-century Japanese singers
21st-century Japanese actresses
21st-century Japanese women singers